Ilir Qela (born 3 January 2001) is a German footballer who plays as a forward for Regionalliga Nord club TSV Havelse.

Career
Qela made his professional debut for TSV Havelse in the 3. Liga on 14 January 2022 against MSV Duisburg, coming on in the 90th minute as a substitute for Kianz Froese.

References

External links
 
 
 
 

2001 births
Living people
German footballers
Footballers from Hanover
Association football forwards
TSV Havelse players
3. Liga players
Regionalliga players